Julie A. Su (born February 19, 1969) is an American attorney who has served as United States deputy secretary of labor since 2021. Before assuming that post, she was the California Labor Secretary, serving under Governor Gavin Newsom, and headed California's Division of Labor Standards Enforcement (DLSE) under Governor Jerry Brown. 

She is serving as acting secretary of labor following the departure of incumbent Marty Walsh from the role. In February 2023, President Joe Biden nominated Su to serve as the United States secretary of labor.

Early life and education
Su was born in Wisconsin as a second generation immigrant. Her mother came to the United States on a cargo ship from China; her father is from Taiwan. She graduated from Gretchen Whitney High School in Cerritos, CA. She earned a Bachelor of Arts degree from Stanford University and a Juris Doctor from Harvard Law School.

Career 
Su started her legal career at the Asian-Pacific American Legal Center. She was a Litigation Director for Advancing Justice L.A., a non-profit civil rights organization. 

Su was the lead attorney for the El Monte Thai Garment Slavery Case.  As the lead for civil case brought by the El Monte garment workers, Su successfully pursued a legal theory that held manufacturers responsible for the wage theft, as well as the operators who actually kept the garment workers captive. She and other activists also petitioned for the workers to be able to stay in the United States under a visa program for those who cooperate with the government in criminal trials.  This led to the creation of the T-Visa for victims of human trafficking.

During Jerry Brown's tenure as governor, Su headed California's Division of Labor Standards Enforcement (DLSE). Under Governor Gavin Newsom, Su served as Secretary of the California Labor and Workforce Development Agency.

United States Department of Labor

Deputy Secretary of Labor 
In November 2020, Su was named as a potential candidate to serve as Secretary of Labor in the Biden administration. Su's prospective nomination was pushed by AAPI political leaders and activists, including the Congressional Asian Pacific American Caucus (CAPAC).

Conversely, she was opposed by business groups and congressional Republicans. Opponents criticized her leadership of California's unemployment agency during the COVID-19 pandemic, when over a million legitimate applicants had their claims delayed or frozen, while up to $31 billion was sent to fraudulent claimants (including to criminals belonging to national and international crime rings and inmates in the state's prison system). Opposition also centered on her enforcement of California's controversial employment law, AB 5.

On February 10, 2021, Su was nominated by President Biden to be the Deputy Secretary of Labor under Secretary Marty Walsh. Asian-American leaders, including members of the Congressional Asian Pacific American Caucus, had lobbied the Biden Administration to appoint her as Deputy Secretary after she wasn't chosen to lead the department.

The Senate HELP Committee held hearings on Su's nomination on March 16, 2021. The committee favorably reported her nomination to the Senate floor on April 21, 2021. On July 13, 2021, Su was confirmed to the role by the Senate, in a 50–47 vote.

Secretary of Labor nomination 
After it was reported in 2023 that Walsh would leave the role, Su was expected to serve as acting secretary of labor in his absence. After Walsh's resignation announcement, members of the Congressional Asian Pacific American Caucus called on Biden to nominate Su as Walsh's permanent successor, citing the lack of Asian-Americans in Biden's cabinet. On February 28, 2023, President Joe Biden nominated Su to serve as the United States secretary of labor.

Awards
Skadden Fellowship
2001 MacArthur Fellows Program
1996 Reebok International Human Rights Award

Works
"Making the Invisible Visible: The Garment Industry's Dirty Laundry" University of Iowa Journal on Gender, Race & Justice (winter 1997–1998)
 "Critical Coalitions," (with Eric Yamamoto) Critical Race Theory: An Anthology
 "Workers at the Crossfire: Immigration Enforcement to Preserve Capital," in Unfinished Liberation (Joy James, ed. Colorado University Press 1999)
 Social Justice: Professionals, Communities and Law (Martha Mahoney, John O. Calmore, Stephanie M. Wildman 2003).

References

1969 births
American people of Taiwanese descent
American politicians of Chinese descent
21st-century American women lawyers
21st-century American lawyers
Biden administration cabinet members
Biden administration personnel
California lawyers
Harvard Law School alumni
Living people
MacArthur Fellows
Stanford University alumni
State cabinet secretaries of California
United States Deputy Secretaries of Labor
Wisconsin lawyers